Marshland St James is a village and civil parish in the English county of Norfolk.
For the purposes of local government, it falls within the district of King's Lynn and West Norfolk.

Churches

 Marshland St James had multiple churches which are Anglican and Methodist. The parish church is St James in the deanery of Lynn Marshland, in the archdeaconry of Wisbech. 
The original Church of England church was St Jame. It was founded in 1837 and closed in 2002. The church did not have a graveyard.
The church does not have a graveyard.

Marshland Fen Methodist Church was founded before 1907. The Primitive Methodist church was an early 19th century (1807) secession from the Wesleyan Methodist church and was particularly successful in evangelising agricultural and industrial communities at open meetings. In 1932 the Primitive Methodists joined with the Wesleyan Methodists and the United Methodists to form the Methodist Church of Great Britain.

Historical geography

Marshland St James is about 11 miles S.W. of King's Lynn.
It was created as an ecclesiastical parish in 1922, and as a civil parish in 1935, from parts of Clenchwarton, Emneth, Terrington St Clement, Terrington St John, Tilney All Saints, Tilney St Lawrence, Tilney cum Islington, Walpole St Andrew, Walpole St Peter, and West Walton. [from Kelly's Directory of Norfolk 1937]

Marshland St James is in Freebridge Marshland hundred.

Notes

External links

</ref>

Villages in Norfolk
Civil parishes in Norfolk
King's Lynn and West Norfolk